Dinesh Chandra Yadav was a member of the 15th Lok Sabha of India from Khagaria and 17th Lok Sabha member from Madhepura as a member of JDU.

Education and background
Yadav is an Engineer by education and holds Diploma in Civil Engineering.

Posts Held

See also
List of members of the 15th Lok Sabha of India

References

External links 

India MPs 2009–2014
Living people
1951 births
Lok Sabha members from Bihar
Janata Dal (United) politicians
India MPs 1996–1997
India MPs 1999–2004
People from Saharsa district
People from Khagaria district
India MPs 2019–present
Members of the Bihar Legislative Assembly
Janata Dal politicians